Yuriy Shevchuk (born 6 May 1985) is a Ukrainian football goalkeeper and football manager.

Career
Shevchuk is a product of youth team systems of FC Polissya and UFK Karpaty. His first trainers were Ruslan Skydan and Valeriy Bliznichenko.

He spent his career mainly as a player in the lower leagues of the Ukraine and Slovakia. But also played two games for FC Lviv in the Ukrainian Premier League in 2008.

References

External links
 
 

1985 births
Living people
People from Zviahel
Ukrainian footballers
FC Karpaty Lviv players
FC Karpaty-2 Lviv players
FC Karpaty-3 Lviv players
FC Halychyna Lviv players
FC Lviv players
FC Lviv-2 players
FC Nyva Ternopil players
FK Bodva Moldava nad Bodvou players
ŠK Odeva Lipany players
FC Rukh Lviv players
Ukrainian Premier League players
Ukrainian expatriate footballers
Expatriate footballers in Slovakia
Ukrainian expatriate sportspeople in Slovakia
Association football goalkeepers
Ukrainian First League players
Sportspeople from Zhytomyr Oblast